Ryu Un-sil (born 3 January 1973) is a North Korean diver. She competed in the women's 10 metre platform event at the 1992 Summer Olympics.

References

External links

1973 births
Living people
North Korean female divers
Olympic divers of North Korea
Divers at the 1992 Summer Olympics
Place of birth missing (living people)
Universiade bronze medalists for North Korea
Medalists at the 1991 Summer Universiade
Universiade medalists in diving